Jonathan Maier (born 9 December 1992) is a German professional basketball player who currently plays for the Nürnberg Falcons BC club of the German ProA league. 

In the past, he has been a member of Germany's A2 national team.

Early life
Maier started playing basketball at age 12 when his parents moved to Bollschweil.

Career
Before the 2017–18 ProA season, he signed a 3-year contract with Nürnberg Falcons BC.

References

External links
Nürnberg Falcons Profile
Sport.de Profile
Scout Basketball Profile
 

1992 births
Living people
Centers (basketball)
German men's basketball players
Mitteldeutscher BC players
Nürnberg Falcons BC players
People from Schramberg
Sportspeople from Freiburg (region)
Ratiopharm Ulm players
Riesen Ludwigsburg players
VfL Kirchheim Knights players